John Watson Funder  (born 1940) is an Australian medical researcher.

Born in Adelaide and educated at the University of Melbourne, John Funder was president of the Australian Society for Medical Research (1979)  and the Endocrine Society of Australia (1984), and (1996–2000) chairman of the International Society for Endocrinology . In 1990 he resigned as a senior research fellow of the National Health and Medical Research Council to become director of the Baker Medical Research Institute (1990–2001). He is a senior fellow at Prince Henry's Institute of Medical Research at Monash Medical Centre, and a professorial fellow at the Centre for Neuroscience at the University of Melbourne. Having published over 500 scientific papers, Funder is an expert in mineralocorticoid receptors and aldosterone biology and serves as a consultant to many pharmaceutical companies engaged in this field.

He is a director of the Harold Mitchell Foundation and is one of the trustees of A & E Finkel Foundation.

Honours
On 26 January 1998, Funder was appointed an Officer of the Order of Australia for service to medicine (particularly in the field of endocrinology research) and in the development of public policy across a range of primary health issues. 17 years later at the 2015 Australia Day Honours, Funder was appointed a Companion of the Order of Australia for eminent service to medicine, particularly to cardiovascular endocrinology, as a renowned researcher, author and educator, to the development of academic health science centres, and to mental illness, obesity, and Indigenous eye-health programs. Funder was also awarded the Centenary Medal in 2001 for service to the commercialisation of health and medical research.

References

External links
Harold Mitchell Foundation biography of John Funder
University of Melbourne. Department of Ophthalmology, Centre for Eye Research Australia: Biography of Professor John Funder AO

1940 births
Living people
Australian endocrinologists
Companions of the Order of Australia
Recipients of the Centenary Medal